San Benito or Villa José Quintín Mendoza is a location in the Cochabamba Department in central Bolivia. It is the seat of the San Benito Municipality, the third municipal section of the Punata Province.

External links 
 Map of the Punata Province

References 

  Instituto Nacional de Estadistica de Bolivia  (INE)

Populated places in Cochabamba Department